Tak to leciało! (It was sung this way!) is the Polish version of Don't Forget the Lyrics!. The show debuted on March 9, 2008 on TVP2. Formerly it was hosted by singer Maciej Miecznikowski but for the revival series he was replaced by Sławomir Zapała (assisted by Magdalena “Kajra” Kajrowicz). The grand prize on the show is 100,000 złotys (formerly 150,000).

Series overwiew

Money tree

Rules
The rules are roughly the same as the original version. The only significant difference from the original version of "Don't Forget the Lyrics!" is the prizes awarded.

References

Don't Forget the Lyrics!
Polish game shows
2008 Polish television series debuts
Telewizja Polska original programming